was the pen name of Japanese manga artist .

Early life and career
Chūsonji was born on May 28, 1962, in Yokohama, Kanagawa Prefecture. She began drawing manga while in elementary school, and worked as a child model in elementary school and middle school. She took a year off after graduating from the faculty of law at Komazawa University, and developed an interest in golf. She began her career in manga in 1987, winning a rookie award from the manga magazines Business Jump and Manga Action in 1987.

Chūsonji's manga addressed themes of business, politics, and culture, typically in the context of the Japanese bubble era of the late 1980s and early 1990s. Her 1989 manga series Ojodan, first published in 1989, went on to sell over 200,000 copies. That same year she serialized Sweet Spot, a comedy about an office lady (OL) interested in golf, in the magazine . Sweet Spot coined the term , a term used to describe young businesswomen who have the interests and hobbies of middle-aged businessmen, such as golf and horse betting.

In the mid-1990s Chūsonji moved to New York City where she wrote the manga series Wild Q, which follows two Japanese men who travel to Brooklyn to learn about hip-hop. The series, serialized in the men's magazine Popeye, was criticized by the Japanese hip hop community for portraying Japanese hip-hop enthusiasts as ignorant. In response, Chūsonji altered her portrayal of Japanese characters in Wild Q and helped finance Hip-Hop Night Flight, the first successful Japanese hip-hop radio show.

Personal life and death
Chūsonji was married to writer and translator Masaaki Kobayashi, with whom she had a son and a daughter. In August 2004, Chūsonji was diagnosed with colorectal cancer and died on January 31, 2005, at the age of 42 to complications from the disease.

References

External links
 Official website (defunct, link via Internet Archive)
  

1962 births
2005 deaths
Japanese female comics artists
Women manga artists
Manga artists
Female comics writers
Deaths from cancer in Japan 
Deaths from colorectal cancer